The Azawagh Arabs (also known as nomadic Moors) are nomadic ethnic Arab-ancestry tribes who are settling mainly in the area of Azawagh which is a dry basin covering what is today northwestern Niger, as well as parts of northeastern Mali and southern Algeria. Azawagh Arabs are named after the Azawagh region of the Sahara and speak Hassaniya Arabic which is one of the regional varieties of Arabic.

See also
 Azawagh
 Moors
 Baggara
 Diffa Arabs

References 

Bibliography

Ethnic groups in Niger
Arab diaspora in Africa
Ethnic groups in Algeria
Ethnic groups in Mali